Ożarowice  is a village in Tarnowskie Góry County, Silesian Voivodeship, in southern Poland. It is the seat of the gmina (administrative district) called Gmina Ożarowice.

The village has a population of 1,700.

References

Villages in Tarnowskie Góry County